Madonna and Child with Saint Roch and Saint Sebastian may refer to:
Madonna and Child with Saint Roch and Saint Sebastian (Lotto)
Madonna and Child with Saint Roch and Saint Sebastian (Moretto)